Sanatan Mahakud is a politician from Odisha, India. He represents the Champua since the year 2014.

On 20 April 2016, Keonjhar district officials announced that they would demolish Mahakud's home due to it being on land originally leased to a mining company named Essel Mining & Industries Limited.but later Mr. Mahakud has taken stay order from Odisha High court.

Early life
Sanatan Mahakud was born in 1958 to Chema Mahakud in a Hindu Gopal (Yadav) family at Nambira village of Kendujhar district in Odisha.

References

Living people
Odisha politicians
People from Kendujhar district
1958 births
Indian National Congress politicians from Odisha